Gokul is an Indian film director who works in Tamil cinema. He made his directional debut with the action drama Rowthiram, followed by an ensemble comedy Idharkuthane Aasaipattai Balakumara. After that, he directed the historical-horror film Kaashmora, starring Karthi in the lead role. His next was the action comedy Junga, featuring Vijay Sethupathi in the lead role. He then directed Anbirkiniyal, the tamil remake of Helen. Gokul is best known for directing interesting stories revolving around offbeat characters and also for handling multiple genres. He is currently working on Corona Kumar featuring Silambarasan, a spin-off of Idharkuthane Aasaipattai Balakumara.

Career

Gokul's maiden venture, Rowthiram, featured Jiiva and Shriya Saran in the lead roles. The movie earned praise for its cinematography and stunt choreography. Later, the movie was dubbed in Telugu as Roudram and in Hindi as Nirbhay The Fighter.

His second movie, Idharkuthane Aasaipattai Balakumara, produced by Leo Visions, featured a huge cast including Vijay Sethupathi, Ashwin Kakumanu, Swathi Reddy, Nandita Swetha, Pasupathy, and Soori. The movie won accolades for its quirky dialogues and intervening plot line.

His third venture was the magnam-opus Kaashmora, with a high production cost starring Karthi and Nayanthara It featured Karthi in dual roles. 

His fourth film, Junga, had Vijay Sethupathi as the titular character. The film was praised for Vijay Sethupathi's acting.

After that he remade malayalam's critically acclaimed Helen in tamil titled Anbirkiniyal. He is currently working on Corona Kumar,  featuring Silambarasan, a spin-off of Idharkuthane Aasaipattai Balakumara. It is a comedy drama film set in corona times.

Filmography

References

Tamil film directors
21st-century Indian film directors
Tamil-language film directors
Tamil screenwriters
Film directors from Chennai
Screenwriters from Tamil Nadu